Antill is a surname. Notable people with the surname include:

Edward Antill (disambiguation), several people
John Antill (1904–1986), Australian composer
John Antill (general) (1866–1937), Australian World War I major general
Thomas Antill (1830–1865), Australian cricketer